Boninagrion is a genus of damselfly in the family Coenagrionidae. It is monotypic in that it contains only one species, Boninagrion ezoin.

References

Coenagrionidae
Monotypic Odonata genera
Zygoptera genera
Taxonomy articles created by Polbot